Mohawk Valley Psychiatric Center is a psychiatric hospital located in Utica. Its predecessor was established in 1836.

History
Mohawk Valley Psychiatric was once called Utica State Hospital; the latter was a lunatic asylum. This haven for the insane was highlighted in 1999 as among New York's "shrinking hospitals for the mentally ill for years. An empty corridor."

Utica State Hospital

 was one of the first hospitals of its type in the United States. It was initially named The New York Lunatic Asylum. To rehabilitate some of its patients "a printing shop was established." In 1844 they published "American Journal of Insanity, the world's first journal devoted to mental illness."

"McPike Addiction Treatment Center is a 68-bed inpatient facility located in Utica, New York, on the campus of the Mohawk Valley Psychiatric Center (MVPC)."

See also
 Utica Psychiatric Center

References

  

Brick buildings and structures
Psychiatric hospitals in New York (state)
New York State Department of Mental Hygiene